The 2007 Colorado Springs mayoral election took place on April 3, 2007, to elect the mayor of Colorado Springs, Colorado. The election was held concurrently with various other local elections. The election was officially nonpartisan.

Results

References

2007
2007 Colorado elections
2007 United States mayoral elections